Ariel Knafo-Noam, also known as Ariel Knafo, is an Israeli developmental psychologist and behavior geneticist. He is a professor in the Department of Psychology at the Hebrew University of Jerusalem, where he is also the head of the Social Development Laboratory. His research has focused on genetic and environmental contributions to prosocial behaviors such as altruism and empathy.

References

External links
Faculty page

Living people
Israeli psychologists
Behavior geneticists
Academic staff of the Hebrew University of Jerusalem
Hebrew University of Jerusalem alumni
Year of birth missing (living people)